National Secondary Route 228, or just Route 228 (or ) is a National Road Route of Costa Rica, located in the Cartago province.

Description
In Cartago province the route covers Cartago canton (Occidental, Guadalupe, Corralillo, Quebradilla districts), El Guarco canton (Tejar, Tobosi districts).

References

Highways in Costa Rica